Sri Aman Division is one of the twelve administrative divisions in Sarawak, Malaysia. Formerly part of the Second Division, which included Betong, Sri Aman Division has a total area of 5,466.7 square kilometres. It was formerly known as  Simanggang District.

Sri Aman Division contains two administrative districts: Sri Aman and Lubok Antu. The total population is 93,379. The population is generally culturally mixed, with Iban,  Malay and Chinese predominating.

The economy of the division is mostly agricultural. Sri Aman Division is in the largest farming area of Sarawak.

The Division also contains the Batang Ai National Park and the Maludam National Park, and tourism, especially ecotourism, and cultural tourism to the Iban longhouses is an important part of the local economy.

History
The Second Division of Sarawak was established on 1 June 1873. It was later renamed to Simanggang Division. The Division was renamed to Sri Aman Division in March 1974.

Sri Aman Division was originally made up of four districts, which were Sri Aman, Lubok Antu, Betong, and Saratok together with 9 smaller districts including Pantu, Lingga, Maludam, Engkilili, Spaoh, Debak, Pusa and Roban.

After the establishment of Betong Division on 26 March 2002, Sri Aman Division comprises only 2 districts and 3 smaller districts, which were Sri Aman and Lubok Antu Districts whereas the smaller districts covers Engkilili, Lingga and Pantu.

Administration 
The land area of the division is 5,466.25 km2 and the population is around 90,000 people. The division's main economy source is agriculture, with palm oil, padi, pepper and cocoa being the main crops.

Members of Parliament

Resident's Roll of Honor
Below is the Resident of Sri Aman Roll of Honor, dating back to its formation in 1869:

 James Brooke Cruickshank (1869–1870) – the first Resident
 Henry Skelton (1870–1873)
 Francis Richard Ord Maxwell (1872–1881)
 Henry Fitzgibbon Deshon (1879–1892)
 Demetrius James Sandford Bailey (1888–1908)
 Rajah Muda Charles Vyner Brooke (1898–1899)
 Arthur Bartlett Ward (1899–1901)
 Frederick Ambrose Wilford Page Turner (1915–1930)
 John Beville Archer (1930–1934)
 Adam Philip Mcdonald (1934–1936)
 Hugh Edward Cutfield (1936–1941) (Sarawak was then occupied by Japan from 1941 to 1945)
 J.C.H. Barcroft (1946–1947) (Sarawak became a British Colony in 1946)
 W.P.N.L. Ditmas (1947–1951)
 A.F.R. Griffin (1951–1953)
 M.J. Forster (1953–1955)
 A.J.N. Richards (1955–1962)
 J.F. Drake-Brockman (1962–1963) (Sarawak became independent, then part of Malaysia in 1963)
 G. Lloyd Thomas (1963–1965) – last foreigner to hold the position of Resident
 Peter Tinggom (1965–1967) – first local to be appointed as Resident
 William Nais (1967–1970)
 Tuan Hj Yusof Bin Tuan Hj Arbi (29.01.1970–16.02.1973)
 Tuan Hj Mohd Fauzi Bin Hj Abd Hamid (16.02.1973–19.05.1980)
 Mohd Hanis Bin Mahlie (20.05.1980–05.08.1983)
 Dr Yusoff Bin Hj Hanifah (06.08.1983–15.08.1984)
 Tuan Hj Abu Kassim Bin Hj Abd Rahim (16.06.1984–01.11.1986)
 Michael Pilo Ak Gangga (01.11.1986–20.03.1987)
 Tuan Hj Abu Kassim Bin Hj Abd Rahim (21.03.1987–30.12.1988)
 Peter Nyaed Juses(31.12.1988–19.03.1989)
 Tuan Hj Mohd Iskandar Bin Abdullah (20.03.1989–18.06.1991)
 Noel Hudson Laga (19.06.1991–02.02.1993)
 Waslie Bin Ramlie (26.02.1993–05.03.1993)
 Peter Nyaed Juses (06.03.1993–06.09.1993) – Reappointed for the 2nd time.
 Waslie Bin Ramlie (06.09.1993–15.03.1997) – also reappointed for the 2nd time.
 Salleh Bin Yusop (14.04.1997–31.12.1998)
 Ganie Ugay (02.01.1999–28.03.2000)
 Patrick Engkasan Ak Entabar @ Digat (01.03.2000–30.11.2002)
 Dr Ngenang Ak Jangu (02.12.2002–02.12.2006)
 Abg Shamshudin Bin Abg Seruji (03.01.2007–15.11.2010)
 Abd Rahman Sebli Bin Senusi (01.12.2010–04.08.2011)

References

External links

 Sri Aman Residen Office
 Sri Aman Tourism